The 1978 Southeastern Conference baseball tournament was held at Perry Field in Gainesville, Florida, from May 12 through 15.  won the tournament and earned the Southeastern Conference's automatic bid to the 1978 NCAA Tournament.

Regular-season results

Tournament

All-Tournament Team 

No MVP was named.

See also 
 College World Series
 NCAA Division I Baseball Championship
 Southeastern Conference baseball tournament

References 

 SECSports.com All-Time Baseball Tournament Results
 SECSports.com All-Tourney Team Lists

Tournament
Southeastern Conference Baseball Tournament
Southeastern Conference baseball tournament
Southeastern Conference baseball tournament
College baseball tournaments in Florida
Baseball competitions in Gainesville, Florida